Richard Parker may refer to:

Public officials

American
 Richard Parker (judge, born 1729) (1729–1813), American jurist who served on the Virginia Supreme Court
 Richard Parker (colonel) (1751–1780), American officer and son of Richard Parker the Virginia jurist
 Richard E. Parker (1783–1840), jurist, Senator from Virginia, grandson of Richard Parker the Virginia jurist
 Richard Parker (congressman) (1810–1893), judge and Congressman from Virginia
 Richard W. Parker (1848–1923), Representative from New Jersey
 Richard Bordeaux Parker (1923–2011), American diplomat and ambassador

British
 Richard Parker (MP for Malmesbury), Member of Parliament (MP) for Malmesbury, 1394
 Richard Parker (MP for Lyme Regis), MP for Lyme Regis, 1421

Academics
 Richard Green Parker (1798–1869), United States educator
 Richard Barry Parker (1867–1947), British architect
 Richard Anthony Parker (1905–1993), Egyptologist
 Richard Davies Parker (born 1945), American law professor
 Richard Parker (economist) (born 1946), American economist and member of The Nation editorial board
 Richard A. Parker (born 1953), mathematician
 Richard G. Parker (anthropologist) (born 1956), public health professional

Sportspeople
 Richard Parker, full name of footballer Dick Parker (1894–1969)
 Richard Parker (rugby league), rugby league footballer of the 1960s
 Rick Parker (baseball) (born 1963), baseball player
 Rich Parker (born 1987), British professional vert skater
 Richard Parker, erroneous name of footballer Reginald Parker (born 1902)

Other people
 Richard Parker (mutineer) (1767–1797), British sailor, leader of the Nore Mutiny
 Richard Thomas Parker (1834–1864), British murderer
 Richard Neville Parker (1884–1958), English botanist and forester
 Richard Parker (1867–1884), the cabin boy victim of shipwreck and murder in R v Dudley and Stephens
 Richard Parker (potter) (born 1946), New Zealand potter
 Rick Parker (artist) (born 1946), American artist, writer, and cartoonist

Fictional characters
 Richard Parker (Life of Pi), a fictional tiger from the 2001 novel Life of Pi
 Richard and Mary Parker, fictional parents of Peter Parker, the alter-ego of Spider-Man
 Richard Parker, in The Narrative of Arthur Gordon Pym of Nantucket, Edgar Allan Poe's only complete novel
 Richard Parker, one of the protagonists of the 1989 film Weekend at Bernie's portrayed by Jonathan Silverman
 Richard Parker, protagonist of Consenting Adults (1992 film) portrayed by Kevin Kline